Li Xianting (born 1949 in Jilin) is an independent art critic and curator of contemporary Chinese art in China. Graduated from Chinese Painting Department, Central Academy of Fine Art in 1978, he became the editor of Fine Art Magazine until 1983.  From 1985 to 1989 he was the editor of the authoritative China Fine Art Newspaper, and was active as independent critic and curator based in Beijing henceforth.

In the late seventies and eighties, Li Xianting was involved in advocating and introducing the avant-garde art form in China. He organized the "Stars exhibition" in 1979, and coined the terms "Cynical Realism"  and "Political Pop". He also lectured and curated international shows, including the China Pavilion at the 45th Venice Biennale (1995). He is now the director of Songzhuang Art Museum  and Li Xianting's Film Fund .

References

1.Cornell University website 
2.The Prince Claus Fund website 
3."Memories of 1989", www.artzinechina.com 

Chinese art critics
Living people
People's Republic of China journalists
Writers from Jilin
Year of birth missing (living people)